Mircea Tutovan-Codoi (born 13 March 1952) is a Romanian volleyball player. He competed in the men's tournament at the 1972 Summer Olympics.

References

1952 births
Living people
Romanian men's volleyball players
Olympic volleyball players of Romania
Volleyball players at the 1972 Summer Olympics
People from Sibiu County